Jonathan Christian Islas Porras best known as Jonathan Islas (born on November 15, 1979, in Mexico City, Mexico) is a Mexican actor mainly known for his roles in various telenovelas.

Career
He started his acting career in theatrical shows in  Colegio Anglo Americano. He later joined TV Azteca's acting school, CEFAT. In 2005, he joined Telemundo.

He currently resides in Los Angeles, California.

Filmography

Television

References

External links
 

Mexican male television actors
1979 births
Living people
Mexican male telenovela actors
People educated at Centro de Estudios y Formación Actoral
Male actors from Mexico City